This is a list of Brazilian television related events from 2016.

Events
27 March - 15-year-old Wagner Barreto wins the first season of The Voice Kids.
5 April - Munik Nunes wins the sixteenth season of Big Brother Brasil.

Debuts

Television shows

1970s
Vila Sésamo (1972-1977, 2007–present)
Turma da Mônica (1976–present)

1990s
Malhação (1995–present)
Cocoricó (1996–present)

2000s
Big Brother Brasil (2002–present)
Dança dos Famosos (2005–present)
Peixonauta (2009–present)

2010s
Meu Amigãozão (2010–present)
The Voice Brasil (2012–present)
Historietas Assombradas (para Crianças Malcriadas) (2013–present)
O Show da Luna (2014–present)
Irmão do Jorel (2014–present)
The Noite com Danilo Gentili (2014–present)
Mundo Disney (2015–present)
Mister Brau (2015–present)

Ending this year
Sítio do Picapau Amarelo (2012-2016)
 Repórter Record Investigação (2014-2016)

Births

Deaths

See also
2016 in Brazil